Farkasréti Cemetery or Farkasrét Cemetery is one of the most famous cemeteries in Budapest. It opened in 1894 and is noted for its extensive views of the city (several people wanted it more to be a resort area than a cemetery).

It comprises tombs of numerous Hungarian notables and it is the most preferred burial place among actors, actresses and other artists (opera singers, musicians, painters, sculptors, architects, writers, poets). The cemetery is also home to the tombs of several scientists, academicians and athletes.

Graves are often decorated with noteworthy sculptures. It was provided with parks in the 1950s, when it took on its present appearance and extent. The mortuary hall and the new chapel were built in the 1980s to the plans of Imre Makovecz.

In the Communist era, funerals were restricted in Kerepesi Cemetery, so it became the main cemetery for those who couldn't get one.

It is located in Buda (the Western part of Budapest), approximately 3 km away from the downtown.

The oldest grave that is still located in its original place is that of the mechanical engineer Ferenc Cathry Szaléz, the designer of the Rack railway in Budapest and the original Mária Valéria bridge in Esztergom.

Notable interments
Vilmos Aba Novák, painter
Karl Aschenbrenner, philosopher
Péter Bacsó, film director and screenwriter
Ervin Baktay, orientalist
Donát Bánki, inventor
Béla Bartók, composer, the sculpture made by Miklós Borsos
Pal Benko, chess player and chess composer
Dénes Berinkey, Prime Minister
Aurél Bernáth, painter and poet
Sándor Bíró, footballer
Miklós Borsos, sculptor
József Bozsik, footballer, member of the Golden Team
Csinszka, Endre Ady's wife
Tamás Cseh, singer and songwriter
Zsuzsa Cserháti, singer
János Csonka, inventor
Béla Czóbel, painter
Ferenc Deák, footballer
József C. Dobos, inventor of the Dobos Cake, a Hungarian speciality
Béla Egresi, footballer
István Eiben, cinematographer
Pál Engel, historian 
Zoltán Fábri, director
Sári Fedák, actress
István Fekete, writer
János Ferencsik, conductor
Noel Field, communist agent and hidden victim of show trials
 Annie Fischer, pianist
Miklós Gábor, actor
Aladár Gerevich, seven-times olympic champion fencer
Gyula Germanus, orientalist
Ernő Gerő, communist politician
Hilda Gobbi, actress
Lisl Goldarbeiter-model
András Hegedűs, Socialist Prime Minister
Éva Janikovszky, writer of children's books
Pál Jávor, actor
Gyula Kabos, actor
Katalin Karády, actress, singer
György Kárpáti, three-times olympic champion water polo player
Lajos Kassák, poet and painter
Manyi Kiss, actress
Károly Kernstok, painter
Kálmán Kittenberger, Africa researcher, naturalist
 Zoltán Kocsis, pianist
Zoltán Kodály, composer, the sculpture made by Pál Pátzai
János Kodolányi, writer
György Kolonics, olympic champion sprint canoeist
Ilona Kolonits, documentary film director, war correspondent
Béla Kondor, painter
János Koós, dance singer, parodist, actor
Margit Kovács, ceramicist and sculptor
László Lajtha, composer
Kálmán Latabár, actor
Imre Makovecz, architect
György Marx, physicist
Istvan Medgyaszay, architect
Ágnes Nemes Nagy, poet
László Németh, writer
István Örkény, writer
László Papp, three-times olympic champion boxer
János Pilinszky, poet
Mátyás Rákosi, Communist leader; now only his initials are visible to avoid vandalism
Éva Ruttkai, actress
Ferenc Sánta, writer
 Zoltán Ozoray Schenker, Olympic fencing champion
Sándor Simonyi-Semadam, Prime Minister
Gábor Szabó, jazz guitarist
Árpád Szakasits, Socialist leader
Pál Szécsi, singer
Árpád Székely, painter, artist
Georg Solti, conductor
Zoltán Tildy, President
Amerigo Tot (born Imre Tóth), sculptor and actor
László Verebélÿ, electrical engineer
Béla Volentik, footballer
Sándor Weöres, poet
József Zakariás, footballer, member of the Golden Team

See also
Kerepesi Cemetery

Resources
 mult-kor.hu

External links

 Budapest Funeral Institute, including
 an overview of the cemetery
List of celebrities with biographies who rest in this cemetery (with pictures)
(The above pages are only in Hungarian.)
Farkasréti Cemetery at Find a Grave

Cemeteries in Budapest
Religion in Budapest
1894 establishments in Hungary
Cemeteries established in the 1890s